Lather may refer to:

Foam, a substance formed by gas bubbles trapped in a liquid or solid
 A type of shaving foam created by mixing shaving soap or shaving cream with water and agitating the mixture with a shaving brush
Läther (pronounced "leather"), a Frank Zappa album
Lather (song), a song by Jefferson Airplane
Lather, a worker who installs the strips used in lath and plaster wall construction

People
Anoop Lather, Haryanvi film actor
Anu Singh Lather (born  1962), Indian academic
Barry Lather (born 1966), American Director & Choreographer
Bhagmender Lather (born 1997), Indian cricketer
Deepak Lather (born 2000), Indian weightlifter 
Sonia Lather (born 1992), Indian boxer